Dudley Williams may refer to:

 Dudley Williams (judge) (1889–1963), Australian judge
 Dudley Williams (MP) (1908–1987), later Rolf Dudley-Williams, British aeronautical engineer and Conservative Party politician
 Dudley Williams (physicist) (1912–2004), American physicist
 Dudley Williams (public servant) (1909–1985), Australian public servant, Secretary of the Department of Shipping and Transport
 Dudley Williams (biochemist) (1937–2010), British scientist
 Dudley Williams (dancer) (1938 - 2015), American modern dancer

See also
 Dudley-Williams baronets